Laurie Tetley (3 September 1921 – 10 February 1994) was an  Australian rules footballer who played with South Melbourne in the Victorian Football League (VFL).

Notes

External links 

1921 births
1994 deaths
Australian rules footballers from Western Australia
Sydney Swans players
East Fremantle Football Club players